The Night of the Bridges (formally Operation Markolet) was a Haganah venture on the night of 16 to 17 June 1946 in the British Mandate of Palestine, as part of the Jewish insurgency in Palestine (1944–7). Its aim was to destroy eleven bridges linking Mandatory Palestine to the neighboring countries Lebanon, Syria, Transjordan and Egypt, in order to suspend the transportation routes used by the British Army. Attacks on a further three bridges had been considered, but were not executed.

Only one operation failed: the Palmach, the elite fighting force of the Haganah, suffered 14 killed and 5 injured at the Nahal Akhziv bridges. The other operations succeeded without injuries.

To disguise and protect the real operations and to confuse the British forces, around 50 diversionary operations and ambushes were carried out throughout the country on the same night. The confusion also allowed the Palmach members to escape more easily after completion of the operations.

Preparations
The Haganah started the preparations in January–February 1946. First, the SHAI (Haganah Intelligence Service), Palmach patrols and forces scheduled to carry out the operation began spotting, photographing and measuring the targets but also exploring possible access and escape paths. They were disguised as lovers enjoying nature or as people on geography excursions.

Originally, the operation should have taken place in May, but due to political reasons it was postponed.

The political leadership forbade an attack on four targets: the railway bridge between the Ras an-Nakura tunnels, and the three bridges over the Jordan and Yarmuk Rivers leading to the Naharayim power plant.

Spared bridges

Objectives

The planners knew that the operation could not cause heavy damage, and that it would only take some weeks for the connections to be restored.
The real targets were:
 demonstration of the ability of the Haganah to operate throughout the country, even in deserted areas or at the center of the Arab population
 demonstration of the ability to sabotage the British Army's operations
 demonstration of the ability of the Haganah to discourage neighboring armies from future involvement
 harming the British Army's prestige as the most powerful force in the Middle East and damaging the legitimacy of the British Mandate
 strengthening and encouraging the Jewish population in Palestine, and showing the Haganah as being as active as the Irgun and Lehi groups

Outcome
The objectives were fully achieved. The Haganah could hit multiple strategic targets at the same time. As a precaution, the Syrian, Lebanese and Trans-Jordanian armies were put on standby, and the borders were tightened. The British Mandate lost a lot of its prestige and suffered financial damage of 250,000 pounds sterling.

Targeted bridges

Reaction
Twelve days later, on 29 June 1946, partly in response to the bridge bombings, the British launched Operation Agatha, whose main goal was to suppress the state of anarchy in Palestine by capturing the most militant Zionists. Numbers for involved British personal varies between 10,000, 17,000 and 25,000. During that surprise action, around 2,700 Jews were arrested, including the senior leadership of the Haganah. The British obtained documentary evidence of Jewish Agency involvement in paramilitary acts and collusion between the Haganah and the more violent groups, Irgun and Lehi.

External links
 Homepage of the Palmach Museum and Information Center

References

1946 in Mandatory Palestine
Haganah
Jewish insurgency in Mandatory Palestine